Harmony Grove School District (HGSD) is a public school district located in parts of Ouachita and Dallas counties with the majority of students living in Ouachita County. HGSD enrollment averages more than 1,000 students attending four schools. The district that encompasses  of land.

The district is governed by a seven-member school board, elected from zones representative of the district's population. HGSD is accredited by the Arkansas Department of Education (ADE).

Attendance area
Within Ouachita County the district includes East Camden. Within Dallas County the district includes Sparkman. A portion of the district extends into Clark County.

Schools 
 Secondary schools
 Harmony Grove High School, serving approximately 400 students in grades 7 through 12.
 Sparkman High School, serving approximately 100 students in grades 7 through 12.

 Elementary schools
 Harmony Grove Elementary School, serving more than 300 students in kindergarten through grade 6.
 Sparkman Elementary School, serving approximately 100 students in pre-kindergarten through grade 6.

References

External links 

 

School districts in Arkansas
Education in Ouachita County, Arkansas
Education in Dallas County, Arkansas
Education in Clark County, Arkansas